Saratov is the largest city and administrative center of Saratov Oblast, Russia, and a major port on the Volga River upstream of Volgograd. Saratov had a population of 901,361, making it the 17th-largest city in Russia by population.

The city stands near the site of Uvek, a city of the Golden Horde. Tsar Feodor I of Russia likely developed Saratov as a fortress to secure Russia's southeastern border. Saratov developed as a shipping port along the Volga and was historically important to the Volga Germans, who settled in large numbers in the city before they were expelled before and during World War II.

Saratov is home to a number of cultural and educational institutions, including the Saratov Drama Theater, Saratov Conservatory, Radishchev Art Museum, Saratov State Technical University, and Saratov State University.

Etymology
The name Saratov may be derived from Sary Tau (Сары Тау), meaning "Yellow Mountain" in the Tatar language. Another version of the name origin derives it from the words Sar Atau, which means the "Boggy Island".

History

Uvek, a city of the Golden Horde, stood near the site of the modern city of Saratov from the mid-13th century until its destruction by Tamerlane in 1395. While the exact date of the foundation of modern Saratov is unknown, plausible theories date it to ca. 1590, during the reign (1584–1598) of Tsar Fyodor Ivanovich, who constructed several settlements along the Volga River in order to secure the southeastern boundary of his state. Town status was granted to it in 1708.

By the 1800s, Saratov had grown to become an important shipping port on the Volga. The Ryazan-Ural Railroad reached Saratov in 1870. In 1896, the line crossed the Volga and continued its eastward expansion. A unique train-ferry, owned by the Ryazan-Ural railroad, provided the connection across the river between the two ends of the railroad for 39 years, before the construction of a railway bridge in 1935.

During January 1915, with World War I dominating the Russian national agenda, Saratov became the destination for deportation convoys of ethnic Germans, Jews, Hungarians, Austrians and Slavs whose presence closer to the western front was perceived as a potential security risk to the state.

During World War II, Saratov was a station on the north–south Volzhskaya Rokada, a specially designated military railroad supplying troops, ammunition and supplies to Stalingrad. In 1942-1943 the city was bombed by German aircraft. The main target was the Kirov oil refinery, which was heavily bombarded, seriously damaging the installation and destroying 80% of its plant and temporarily interrupting its work. The Luftwaffe was able to destroy all the fuel stock at bases in Saratov and eliminate the oil plant in the city.

Until the end of the Soviet Union in 1991, the Soviet authorities designated Saratov a "closed city"; off-limits to all foreigners due to its military importance as the site of a vital facility manufacturing military aircraft.

German community

Saratov played a prominent role in the history of the Volga Germans. These Germans, who arrived in the region in response to the express invitation to populate these lands made to them by Tsarina Catherine II of Russia in 1763, had this city as the administrative center of the German community established on the left bank of the Volga River, along different agricultural colonies. Meanwhile, the Germans who settled in the lands to the right of the Volga, had the city of Samara as their administrative center. Catherine II, through her two edicts published in Germany, had promised the settlers that they would remain German, enjoying a great deal of autonomy, even if they moved to the Volga region, and they did so. There, the Germans continued with their German language, their own education, their churches, their publications, etc.

However, after more than a century living in that region, the living conditions of the Germans began to change. Catherine II was no longer alive, and the government began to apply an aggressive Russification policy, which meant that from 1878 some groups of Volga Germans began to emigrate to the United States, Canada, Brazil and Argentina. Those who could not leave or who remained in the hope conditions would improve suffered greatly. Hostilities did not stop even after the confiscation of their assets. In 1941, Stalin ordered the deportation of all ethnic Germans.

Today only a few reminders remain of the once prominent place for Volga Germans. The Roman Catholic St. Klemens Cathedral, which had been built by the Volga Germans on the main street of Saratov, the then called "German Street", has its steeples removed and was converted into the Pioneer Cinema by order of the Soviet government (religion was prohibited).  Meanwhile, the old German Street, the pedestrian street of Saratov, was renamed Kirov Prospect in reference to the Bolshevik leader Sergei Kirov, a name that still retains.

Administrative and municipal status
Saratov is the administrative center of the oblast and, within the framework of administrative divisions, it also serves as the administrative center of Saratovsky District, even though it is not a part of it. As an administrative division, it is incorporated separately as the city of oblast significance of Saratov—an administrative unit with the status equal to that of the districts. As a municipal division, the city of oblast significance of Saratov is incorporated as Saratov Urban Okrug.

Geography

Climate 
Saratov has a moderately continental climate with warm and dry summers and an abundance of sunny days.

Summers are hot and dry in Saratov.

Snow and ice are dominant during the winter season. Days well above freezing and nights below  both occur in the winter.

Economy and infrastructure

Saratov Oblast is highly industrialized, due in part to the richness in natural and industrial resources of the area. The oblast is also one of the more important and largest cultural and scientific centers in Russia. Saratov possesses six institutes of the Russian Academy of Sciences, twenty-one research institutes, nineteen project institutes, as well as the Saratov State University, the Saratov State Socio-Economic University, the Saratov State Technical University, and many scientific and technological laboratories attached to some of the city's large industrial enterprises.

Transportation
Saratov is served by the Saratov Gagarin Airport (opened in 20 August 2019 replacing Saratov Tsentralny Airport). The airport serves flights to both international and domestic destinations. Saratov West is a general aviation airfield. The aerospace manufacturing industry is served by the Saratov South airport. Nearby Engels-2 (air base) is the main base for Russian strategic Tu-95 and Tu-160 bombers. Motorways link Saratov directly to Volgograd, Samara, and Voronezh. The railways also play an important role. The Privolzhskaya Railway is headquartered in Saratov. The Volga itself is an important inland waterway. Buses and trolleybuses form the backbone of public transport in the city.

Saratov has a tram network, which opened in 1908. Currently, there are two depots, while a third was closed in 2001. The rolling stock currently consists of 71-605, 71-619, 71-608 and a number of refurbished Tatra T3, renamed to MTTE and MTTCh.

A trolleybus network is also present in the city. On July 2, 2021, an intercity route over the Volga was opened, linking to the trolleybus network of Engels.

City budget 
Information about revenues and expenditures of the city budget for the period 2007–2017.

Education

Saratov is host to a number of colleges and universities. These include the Saratov State University (1909), Saratov State Technical University, Saratov State Medical University, Saratov State Academy of Law and Saratov State Agrarian University. In 2014 a newly renovated campus for the Saratov Regional College of Art was opened.

Culture

One of the city's most prominent landmarks is the 19th century neo-Gothic Conservatory. When it was built in 1912, the Conservatory was Russia's third such institution (after Moscow and St. Petersburg). At the time, Saratov, with a population of 240,000, was the third-largest city in Russia. The main building of the conservatory had been built in 1902 by architect Alexander Yulyevich Yagn, and originally it housed a music school. Before the opening of the conservatory in 1912, the building was reconstructed by the architect Semyon Akimovich Kallistratov. When Saratov Conservatory opened in September 1912, it immediately had 1,000 students ready to begin their studies.

The Saratov Drama Theater was founded in 1802, making it one of Russia's oldest. It is ranked as one of Russia's National Theaters. In Soviet times, the theater was renamed in honor of Karl Marx, but now carries the name of Ivan Slonov (1882–1945), an actor, theatrical director and educator, born in the city. The full name in Russian is The I. A. Slonov Saratov State Academic Theater.

Saratov is noted for several art museums, including the Radishchev Art Museum, named for Alexander Radishchev, Fedin Art Museum, named after Russian novelist Konstantin Fedin, Saratov Local History Museum, Chernyshevsky Estate Museum, named for Nikolay Chernyshevsky, and some others. The Radishchev Art Museum contains more than 20,000 exhibits, including ancient Russian icons, works by Camille Corot, Auguste Rodin, as well as works by some of the finest Russian painters (e.g. Ivan Kramskoy, Vasily Polenov, Ilya Repin, Ivan Shishkin, Aleksandra Ekster, Pavel Kuznetsov, Aristarkh Lentulov, Robert Falk, Pyotr Konchalovsky, Martiros Saryan, Fyodor Rokotov).

Demographics
More than 90% of the city's population are ethnic Russians. Among the remainder are Tatars, Ukrainians, Armenians, Kazakhs and others.

Sports
Several sports clubs are active in the city:

Twin towns – sister cities

Saratov is twinned with:

 Chapel Hill, United States
 Carrboro, United States
 Dallas, United States
 Dobrich, Bulgaria
 Wuhan, China

Notable people

Roman Abramovich, businessman
Boris Andreyev, actor
Oleg Antonov, aircraft designer
Boris Babochkin, actor, director
Denis Bakurskiy, former Russian professional football player
Rachel Bluwstein, poet
Alexey Bogolyubov, painter
Viktor Borisov-Musatov, painter
Nikolay Chernyshevsky, philosopher
Gavrila Derzhavin, poet
Irina Dryagina, World War II pilot and scientist
Konstantin Fedin, writer
Nikolai Grandkovsky, painter
Joseph Hakobyan, engineer
Lev Igorev, painter
Anastasia Karpova, pop singer
Lev Kassil, writer
Kombinaciya, pop band
Pavel Kuznetsov, painter
Eduard Limonov, writer and politician
Konstantin Paustovsky, writer
Kuzma Petrov-Vodkin, painter
Lev Pitaevskii, physicist
Natalia Pogonina, chess player, women Grandmaster (WGM)
Jean-Victor Poncelet, French engineer and mathematician (POW)
Alexander Radishchev, writer
Lidiya Ruslanova, Russian folk singer
Sweeney Schriner, ice hockey player
Nikolay Semyonov, Nobel Prize-winning chemist
Fyodor Shekhtel, architect
Leonid Sobinov, operatic tenor
Pyotr Stolypin, statesman
Vladimir Stoupel, pianist and conductor
Oleg Tabakov, actor
Evgeny Tomashevsky, chess Grandmaster and former World number 15
Valeriya, pop singer
Nikolai Vavilov, biologist and geneticist, died in a Saratov jail
Mikhail Vrubel, painter
Oleg Yankovsky, actor
Nikolay Zinin, chemist
Zedd, music producer and DJ, born in Saratov and moved to Germany.
Elvira T, singer
Katia Elizarova, model
Nikolai Bondarenko, politician

References

Sources

External links

Official website of Saratov 

The Saratov Room (local news, events and places)
Saratov.Ru
Old photos of Saratov
Saratov Regional Museum of Local Lore
Radischev Art Gallery
Catalog of the Radishchev Gallery
Cultural guide to Saratov
Google Earth view of Saratov

 
Saratovsky Uyezd
Populated places on the Volga
Cities and towns in Saratov Oblast
Volga German people